Borran-e Sofla (also Romanized as Borrān-e Soflá; also known as Borrān-e Pā'īn) is a village in Qeshlaq-e Gharbi Rural District, Aslan Duz District, Parsabad County, Ardabil Province, Iran. At the 2006 census, its population was 649, in 121 families.

References 

Towns and villages in Parsabad County